"Sum 2 Prove" is a song by American rapper Lil Baby, released on January 09, 2020 as the second single for his second studio album My Turn (2020). A music video was released on February 18, 2020.

Composition
The song is backed by "retro" synths and soulful piano chords, with Lil Baby rapping "as if he's still got a chip on his shoulder".

In popular culture
"Sum 2 Prove" appears on the NBA 2K21 video game soundtrack.

Charts

Weekly charts

Year-end charts

Certifications

References

2020 singles
2020 songs
Lil Baby songs
Songs written by Lil Baby